Plasma needling is a minimally invasive aesthetic medical procedure purported to rejuvenate skin, minimize the appearance of hypertrophic and hypotrophic scars and stretchmarks, and reduce pattern hair loss through multimodal physical and biochemical cellular stimulation. It is a combination of classical medical micro-needling by Dermaroller or DermaPen. Both are used in Collagen induction therapy and PRP (platelet-rich plasma), the latter is used in Prolotherapy as well as in the Vampire facelift. The stimulating effects on fibroblasts, cells, and micro-needling stemcells are already shown in scientific publications regarding micro-needling, and the injection of PRP, has also been tested as a combined treatment.

The term "plasma needling" began to emerge between 2013 and 2014. Plasma needling is already being performed in many clinics and practices. However, the efficacy of this technique is yet to be confirmed in large-scale controlled clinical trials.

References

Medical procedures